DSJ may refer to:

 Dennis Smith Jr. (born 1997), American basketball player
 Deutsche Internationale Schule Johannesburg, one of the oldest schools in Johannesburg, South Africa
 DoG Street Journal, a news magazine written by students at the College of William & Mary in Williamsburg, Virginia, USA
Daily Star-Journal, a newspaper written by journalists of Warrensburg, Missouri, USA